Bolton Lake is a lake in Kenora District, Ontario, Canada. The primary outflow is an unnamed creek, which flows into Lower Manitou Lake just south of Watson's Narrows. Bolton Lake lies just west over a small ridge of Bolton Bay on Lower Manitou Lake.

See also
List of lakes in Ontario

References

Lakes of Kenora District